Qui sera millionaire? (literally, "Who Will Be a Millionaire?") is the French-language Belgian adaptation of the game show format Who Wants to Be a Millionaire?. Hosted by Alain Simons, it aired on RTL-TVI from 28 August 2000 to June 2005, and from September to October 2008.

Money tree

History
The show began with a jackpot of 10 million Belgian francs. Only one contestant, Katia Savignano on 4 June 2001, won the jackpot in the entire history of the show. Starting from 31 December 2001, the jackpot became €1,000,000, roughly four times as much as before. The series reached peaks of 700,000 viewers, a 40% market share.

In June 2005, it was announced that the show would not return for autumn, having already been put earlier in the schedule due to the success of Lost. It remained off air until it was announced in July 2008 that it would return. Running from 8 September to 13 October, it received an average audience of 379,000 (21.7% market share).

References

2000 Belgian television series debuts
2008 Belgian television series endings
2000s Belgian game shows
Who Wants to Be a Millionaire?
RTL-TVI original programming